Wu Ping (born 1965/1966) is a Chinese woman who became a celebrity over her holding out in one of the most famous nail house incidents in China. Ms Wu's house was in the middle of a construction site for a new shopping mall in Chongqing. She was the only one of 281 families in the area who rejected an offer of a new house or financial compensation to move from the site in 2004. Wu held on refusing to leave her house and restaurant after the state told her to do so.

On April 4, 2007, the house in central Chongqing was destroyed and Wu and her family received a one million yuan settlement plus a new apartment. The story gained international attention and became an inspiration for other Chinese citizens to resist developers, who are sometimes backed by the government. Wu Ping demanded more money than she was offered and became a celebrity in China. She and her husband have moved into their new flat. She has been on numerous TV shows.

References

External links

People from Chongqing
Living people
Real estate holdout
1965 births
Chinese women activists